The 2021 OFC Champions League was originally to be the 20th edition of the Oceanian Club Championship, Oceania's premier club football tournament organized by the Oceania Football Confederation (OFC), and the 15th season under the current OFC Champions League name.

The tournament, which would usually be played in the first half of the year, were originally postponed to start no earlier than 1 July due to border closures throughout the Pacific caused by the COVID-19 pandemic. On 4 June 2021, the OFC announced that the tournament had been cancelled, and no champions would be awarded for the second season in a row. The OFC representative at the 2021 FIFA Club World Cup in Japan, which would originally be the winners of the 2021 OFC Champions League, was confirmed to be Auckland City on 3 August 2021 following a decision by the OFC Executive Committee, based on sporting merit principles which took into consideration the final placing of every member association's national league champion and runner-up in each OFC Champions League between 2016 and 2020, with the results combined to determine an overall ranking, and applied to the clubs nominated by their member association as the champion or runner-up from their respective national leagues to qualify for the 2021 OFC Champions League. However, on 31 December 2021, FIFA announced that Auckland City had withdrawn from the competition due to the COVID-19 pandemic and related quarantine measures required by the New Zealand authorities. As a result, AS Pirae were nominated as the OFC's representative in their place.

Hienghène Sport, having won the title in 2019, were the title holders, since the 2020 edition was cancelled due to the COVID-19 pandemic and the title was not awarded. However, they failed to qualify for the tournament.

Teams
A total of 18 teams from all 11 OFC member associations were eligible to enter the competition.
The seven developed associations (Fiji, New Caledonia, New Zealand, Papua New Guinea, Solomon Islands, Tahiti, Vanuatu) would be awarded two berths each in the group stage.
The four developing associations (American Samoa, Cook Islands, Samoa, Tonga) would be awarded one berth each in the qualifying stage, with the winners and runners-up advancing to the group stage.

Notes

Schedule
The tournament would originally be played between January and May 2021, with the qualifying stage scheduled to be played in Samoa in January, and the group stage starting in February. However, the OFC announced on 5 November 2020 that the tournament would begin no earlier than 1 July due to the COVID-19 pandemic. On 4 March 2021, the OFC announced that the tournament would be played before 31 October 2021, and one option was to hold a single, centralised tournament in Fiji in October. However, the tournament was eventually cancelled after a number of options were explored due to border closures throughout the Pacific.

The original schedule of the competition, as planned before the pandemic, was as follows.

References

External links
OFC Champions League 2021, oceaniafootball.com

2021
1
Association football events cancelled due to the COVID-19 pandemic